Shadows is the third studio album by the Australian recording artist Lenka, released on 2 June 2013 by Skipalong Records.

Track listing

Personnel
Credits and personnel for Shadows adapted from AllMusic.
Tracy Bonham – violin
Gavin Brown – vocals
Greg Calbi – mastering
Lenny DeRose – engineer
Jonathan Dreyfus – violin
Jean Philippe Goncalves – bass guitar
Graham Finn – guitars
James Gulliver Hancock – artwork
Zoe Hauptmann – bass guitar
Paul Herman – composer
Lenka – vocals , glockenspiel, instrumentation, keyboards, organ, piano, producer, synthesizer, vibraphone, wurlitzer
Danny Levin – horn, horn engineer
Pierre Marchand – producer
Rich Mercurio – drums
Francois Plante – vocals
Zac Rae – composer, drums
Jason Reeves – composer, background vocals
Maxime St. Pierre – flugelhorn
Kevin Salem – bass guitar, composer, engineer, guitar, keyboards, noise, percussion, producer, programming
Thomas "Tawgs" Salter – composer, instrumentation, producer
Tom Schutzinger – bass guitar, composer, drums, engineer, guitars, keyboards, percussion, producer, strings
Pascal Shefteshy – engineer, acoustic guitar
Doug Yowell – drums

Charts

References

2013 albums
Lenka albums